Peter Thord John Passey (born 13 July 1952) is an English former professional footballer. A defender, he represented England youth as they attempted to qualify for the 1970 UEFA European Under-18 Championship. He began his club career as an apprentice with Birmingham City, but never played for their first team. In the 1971–72 Football League season, he played 20 matches on loan at Newport County, joined the club on a permanent basis in December 1972, and went on to make 136 league appearances, scoring twice. In 1976, he joined Bridgend Town.

References

1952 births
Living people
Footballers from Birmingham, West Midlands
Association football defenders
English footballers
England youth international footballers
Birmingham City F.C. players
Newport County A.F.C. players
Bridgend Town A.F.C. players
English Football League players